Associazione Sportiva Dilettante Cagliese Calcio is an Italian association football club located in Cagli, Marche. It currently plays in the Italian seventh division after playing in Serie D in the late 2000s. Its colors are yellow and red.

The club was founded in 1920. Umberto Mochi was the first president.

References

External links
 Unofficial homepage
 Cagliese page @ Serie-D.com

Football clubs in Italy
Football clubs in the Marche
Association football clubs established in 1922
1922 establishments in Italy